Drillia roseola is a species of sea snail, a marine gastropod mollusk in the family Drilliidae.

Description
The size of an adult shell varies between 15 mm and 31 mm.

Distribution
This species occurs in the demersal zone of the tropical Eastern Pacific Ocean from Mexico to Ecuador.

References

  Tucker, J.K. 2004 Catalog of recent and fossil turrids (Mollusca: Gastropoda). Zootaxa 682:1–1295

External links
 
  W.H. Dall (1909),  Report on the collection of shells from Peru ;Proceedings of the United States National Museum, Vol. 37, pages 147–294, with Plates 20–28

roseola
Gastropods described in 1955